Jeff Tarango and Daniel Vacek were the defending champions, but Vacek did not participate this year.  Tarango partnered Olivier Delaître, losing in the final.

Ellis Ferreira and Rick Leach won the title, defeating Delaître and Tarango 7–5, 6–4 in the final.

Seeds

Draw

Draw

External links
Draw

2000 Heineken Open